The 34th Hundred Flowers Awards was held on November 10, 2018, in Foshan, Guangdong, China, with Dante Lam's Operation Red Sea winning big at the gala.

Winners and nominees

References 

2018
2018 film awards